The 2016 Winston-Salem Open was a men's tennis tournament played on outdoor hard courts. It was the 48th edition of the Winston-Salem Open (as successor to previous tournaments in New Haven and Long Island), and part of the ATP World Tour 250 Series of the 2016 ATP World Tour. It took place at Wake Forest University in Winston-Salem, North Carolina, United States, from August 23 through August 29, 2015. It was the last event on the 2016 US Open Series before the 2016 US Open.

Singles main-draw entrants

Seeds

 Rankings are as of August 15, 2016

Other entrants
The following players received wildcards into the singles main draw:
  Roberto Bautista Agut
  Bjorn Fratangelo
  Rajeev Ram
  Frances Tiafoe

The following player received entry using a protected ranking:
  Thanasi Kokkinakis

The following players received entry from the qualifying draw:
  Radu Albot
  James Duckworth
  James McGee
  Yoshihito Nishioka

The following player received entry as a lucky loser:
  Tim van Rijthoven

Withdrawals
Before the tournament
  Borna Ćorić →replaced by  Daniel Evans
  Marcel Granollers →replaced by  Víctor Estrella Burgos
  Ernests Gulbis →replaced by  Pierre-Hugues Herbert
  Nicolas Mahut →replaced by  Lukáš Rosol
  Juan Mónaco →replaced by  Evgeny Donskoy
  Benoît Paire →replaced by  Damir Džumhur
  Guido Pella →replaced by  Stéphane Robert
  Dudi Sela →replaced by   Jan-Lennard Struff
  Horacio Zeballos →replaced by  Tim van Rijthoven

During the tournament
  Mikhail Youzhny

Retirements
  Jiří Veselý

Doubles main-draw entrants

Seeds

 Rankings are as of August 15, 2016

Other entrants
The following pairs received wildcards into the doubles main draw:
  Andre Begemann /  Leander Paes 
  Skander Mansouri /  Christian Seraphim

Champions

Singles

  Pablo Carreño Busta def.  Roberto Bautista Agut, 6–7(6–8), 7–6(7–1), 6–4

Doubles

  Guillermo García López /  Henri Kontinen def.  Andre Begemann /  Leander Paes, 4–6, 7–6(8–6), [10–8]

External links
Official website

2016 ATP World Tour
2016 US Open Series
2016 in American tennis
2016
August 2016 sports events in the United States